Ivan Innokentyevich Serebrennikov (14 July 1882 - 19 June 1953) was a Russian statesman and Siberian regionalist. He served as Chairman of the Administrative Council of the Siberian Republic from 3rd September to 3rd November 1918 and Minister of Supply for the Russian State from 18 November to 27 December 1918.

Early life
Ivan Serebrennikov was born on the 14th of July 1882 in Znamenka, Zhigalovsky District of the Irkutsk Governorate. Serebrennikov received his secondary education in the Irkutsk Classical Gymnasium. On 1 January 1906 he was arrested for participating in an illegal gathering for New Years Day and was sentenced to 3 months in prison. At the end of his sentence, in April 1906, he was expelled from Irkutsk. In the same month he married Alexandra Nikolaevna.

He studied at the Military Medical Academy in St. Petersburg. He then lived in St. Petersburg for several years. He was arrested in St. Petersburg for participating in the activities involving the Socialist-Revolutionary Party leading him to serve six-months of solitary confinement.

Political Activities
Serebrennikov returned to Irkutsk in 1911 and by 1913 he had become the secretary of the city council in Irkutsk secretary of the city council in Irkutsk. In 1914 he became a member of the Irkutsk Committee for the Union of Cities.

During the Russian Civil War, Serebrennikov became Chairman of the Administrative Council for short-lived Siberian Republic under Pyotr Vologodsky.

After Alexander Kolchak's coup against the Provisional All-Russian Government, Serebrennikov became Minister of Supply

Exile
After the Bolsheviks took control of Irkutsk in 1920, Serebrennikov was forced to flee to Harbin in China. He arrived in March 1920. He died in Tianjin on 19 June 1953.

References 
 
 

1882 births
1953 deaths
People from Irkutsk Oblast
People from Irkutsk Governorate
Politicians from the Russian Empire
White Russian emigrants to China